Game Plan was a pinball manufacturer that produced pinball tables from 1978 to 1985. Game Plan was a subsidiary of AES Technology Systems and was located in Elk Grove Village, Illinois. Game Plan's president was former Chicago Coin table designer Wendell McAdams.

The company initially produced cocktail-style pinball tables and produced five different models in their first year of existence. The company began producing full-size tables with 1979's Sharpshooter, a "Wild West" themed table. Sharpshooter, incidentally, was Game Plan's best-selling table, having produced 4,200 units in all.
From 1980 through 1982, Game Plan also released a small number of video games, most all of them licensed from other manufacturers, beginning with Tora Tora in 1980. Other games include: Killer Comet, Intruder, Megatack, Kaos, and Pot Of Gold.

Former Game Plan designer John Trudeau went on to design many other pinball games at Gottlieb/Premier and later Williams, including titles such as The Machine: Bride of Pin*Bot (1991) and The Flintstones (1994). Ed Cebula later worked as a table designer and mechanical engineer at Data East Pinball.

Pinball tables (full-sized and cocktail)
Real (1978, cocktail)
Black Velvet (1978, cocktail)
Camel Lights (1978, cocktail)
Foxy Lady (1978, cocktail)
Chuck-A-Luck (1978, cocktail)
Family Fun (1978, cocktail)
Star Trip (1979, cocktail)
Sharpshooter (1979, Game Plan's first full-sized pin)
Vegas (1979, cocktail)
Old Coney Island (1979)
Super Nova (1980)
Pinball Lizard (1980)
Global Warfare (1981, widebody; only 10 units produced)
Mike Bossy the Scoring Machine (1982, never produced)
Sharpshooter II (1983)
Attila the Hun (1984)
Agents 777 (1984)
Captain Hook (1985)
Lady Sharpshooter (1985, cocktail)
Andromeda (1985)
Cyclopes (1985)
Loch Ness Monster (1985, only one prototype produced)

References

External links
Game Plan Pinball.com website - History
Internet Pinball Database - Game Plan

Pinball manufacturers